Carta (formerly eShares, Inc.) is a San Francisco, California-based technology company that specializes in capitalization table management and valuation software. The company digitizes paper stock certificates along with stock options, warrants, and derivatives to help companies, investors and employees manage their equity, while creating a real-time picture of company ownership. The company also operates the CartaX private stock exchange, and issues studies highlighting the gender equity gap across industries.

Carta was founded in 2012 by Henry Ward and Manu Kumar.

History 
Carta was founded as eShares in 2012 by entrepreneur Henry Ward and serial investor Manu Kumar.  Ward became CEO and Kumar became the company's Chairman. The company launched when the founders saw a need for venture-backed companies to electronically manage equity, issue securities, and track their cap tables.

In August 2015 eShares raised a $17 million Series B, led by Spark Capital.

In October 2016 eShares partnered with cloud-based human resources company Zenefits to add equity management to Zenefits' platform.

On September 1, 2017, eShares acquired competitor Silicon Valley Bank's valuation business Silicon Valley Bank Analytics (SVBA). In October Carta raised a $42 million Series C, led by Menlo Ventures and Social Capital. Matt Murphy of Menlo Ventures and Arjun Sethi of Social Capital joined the board of directors.  In November, CEO Ward announced in a blog post that eShares would start doing business under a new name, Carta.

In December 2018 Carta raised $80 million in series D and reached a valuation of $800 million, led by Tribe Capital and Meritech Capital Partners.

In May 2019, the company raised $300 million in a Series E round at a $1.7 billion valuation, led by Andreessen Horowitz. In November, the company received coverage for announcing new employee separation policies, including approving departure pay for all employees, while removing separation agreements and legal documents. The company also was one of the first to extend option exercise windows for departing employees, as employees became more concerned about their equity stakes.

In 2020, a series F funding round valued the company at $3.1 billion.

In January 2021, launched a private stock exchange called CartaX, to allow employees and shareholders to sell private shares before an IPO or acquisition. In February, the company sold just under $100 million of its own stock on CartaX.

In September 2022, Carta acquired UK competitor Capdesk for an undisclosed sum.

Products and services
Carta develops software to help companies maintain their capitalization tables, which show a company's percentages of ownership, equity dilution, and value of equity in each round of investment by founders, investors, and other owners. The company's software also helps customers digitally manage their valuations, portfolio investments and equity plans. Financial news website Business Insider called the company "the NASDAQ for private companies".

Carta's software allows company founders to issue digital share certificates to investors, employees, and others who qualify for stock options. It also develops a centralized dashboard, for issuers to keep track of stock ownership, the timing and pricing of shares issued, and which owners are willing to sell. Venture firms also use Carta's software to manage their portfolios.

The company also operates the CartaX private stock exchange, a way for employees and shareholders to sell their stocks before the company goes public or is acquired.

The company's focus on capitalization tables led to a series of equity gap studies called Table Stakes. The reports highlight the equity gaps between employees and founders based on gender, race,  ethnicity and geography in a variety of industries, including high tech.

Operations
Carta is headquartered in San Francisco, California.  As of August 2022, the company was reportedly tracking over $2.5 trillion  in company equity, and had facilitated $13 billion in secondary-market sales. Its customers include Slack, Coinbase, Casper, Tilray and Affirm. Henry Ward is the company's CEO.

Recognition
Carta ranked #44 in Forbes' The Cloud 100 list for 2019 and ranked #27 for 2020. In 2019, Forbes also named the company to its Fintech 50 list.

References 

Companies based in San Francisco
American companies established in 2012
Software companies based in California